Tracy Evans,  (born 8 December 1967) is an American freestyle skier.

She was born in Hornell, New York. She competed at the 1994 Winter Olympics in Lillehammer, where she placed seventh in women's aerials. She also took part in the 1998 Winter Olympics in Nagano, and in the 2002 Winter Olympics in Salt Lake City. During the 2018 Winter Olympics, Evans was inducted into the Olympians for Life project for challenging gender stereotypes and the right to play.

References

External links 
 

1967 births
People from Hornell, New York
Living people
American female freestyle skiers
Olympic freestyle skiers of the United States
Freestyle skiers at the 1994 Winter Olympics
Freestyle skiers at the 1998 Winter Olympics
Freestyle skiers at the 2002 Winter Olympics
21st-century American women